Mario Moreno Arcos (born 15 October 1958) is a Mexican politician from the Institutional Revolutionary Party (PRI). From 2009 to 2012 he served as Deputy of the LXI Legislature of the Mexican Congress representing Guerrero.

Moreno Arcos was first elected to office as a local deputy in the LVI Legislature of the Congress of Guerrero. He then served as municipal president of Chilpancingo de los Bravo from 2005–2008 and again in 2012 following the Guerrero State Election. He announced his candidacy for Governor of Guerrero in January 2021.

Mario is the cousin of Humberto Moreno Catalán, spokesperson for the paramilitary group called "Los Tlacos" and José Carlos "La Calentura" Moreno Flores, arrested in 2011 and accused by the federal government of being the operator of Joaquín "El Chapo" Guzmán in the Sierra de Guerrero.

References

1958 births
Living people
Politicians from Guerrero
Institutional Revolutionary Party politicians
21st-century Mexican politicians
Members of the Chamber of Deputies (Mexico) for Guerrero
Deputies of the LXI Legislature of Mexico
Municipal presidents in Guerrero
Members of the Congress of Guerrero